This is a list of the Maryland state historical markers in Frederick County.

This is intended to be a complete list of the official state historical markers placed in Frederick County, Maryland by the Maryland Historical Trust (MHT). The locations of the historical markers, as well as the latitude and longitude coordinates as provided by the MHT's database, are included below. There are currently 24 historical markers located in Frederick County.

References 

Frederick County